Kochari is a folk dance originating in the Armenian Highlands. It is performed today by Armenians, while variants are performed by Assyrians, Azerbaijanis (yalli, uchayag, and tello), Kurds (dilan, delîlo, and sêxanî), and Pontic Greeks (kotsari). It is a form of circle dance.

Each region in the Armenian Highlands had its own Kochari, with its unique way of both dancing and music.

Etymology
In Armenian, "Kochari" literally means "knee-come". Գուճ (gudj or goudj) means "knee" and արի (ari) means "come".
In Azerbaijani Turkish, "köç" means "to move" used both as a verb and as a noun, with the latter used more in the context of nomads' travelling. "Köçəri" is also both an adjective and a noun, meaning a "nomad" and "nomadic" simultaneously. Likewise, Kurdish "koçer" means "nomad," and thus the term "Koçerî" means "nomadic," which was borrowed from Turkish.
In Pontic Greek, from the Greek "κότσι" (in Pontic Greek "κοτς") meaning "heel" (from Medieval Greek "κόττιον" meaning the same) and "αίρω" meaning "raise", all together "raising the heel", since the Greeks consider the heel to be the main part of the foot which the dancer uses.

Versions
John Blacking describes Kochari as follows:

Armenian 

Armenians have been dancing Kochari for over a thousand years. The dance is danced to a  rhythm. Dancers form a closed circle, putting their hands on each other's shoulders.

The dance is danced by both men and women and is intended to be intimidating. More modern forms of Kochari have added a "tremolo step", which involves shaking the whole body. It spread to the eastern part of Armenia after the Armenian genocide. The Armenian Kochari has been included to the List of Intangible Cultural Heritage in Need of Urgent Safeguarding of UNESCO in 2017.

Azerbaijani 

It is one of the widely spread dances known as Yalli in Azerbaijan, especially in Nakhchivan Autonomous Republic and surrounding areas. The “Kochari” dancing, consisting of slow and rapid parts, is of three variants. In the men or women lining up one after another or one woman after one man position, a yallihead (holder) holds a stick in his or her hand. This stick is not to punish the dancers but it has importance in dancing.

Today this dancing is played in the Nakhchivan land of which Sharur, Sadarak, Kangarli, Julfa and Shahbuz regions' folklore collectives and it is performed at weddings. Kochari along with tenzere has been included to the list of Intangible Cultural Heritage in Need of Urgent Safeguarding of UNESCO in November 2018 as versions of Yalli dance.

Kurdish Koçerî 
Koçerî is a special form of the "Dilan", "Delîlo", or "Şêxanî" Kurdish dance. "Koçerî" means "nomadic" in Kurdish, where "koçer" means nomad, thus the name used by Kurds means "nomads' dance".  As the name suggests, it is more common among Kurdish nomads.

Pontic Greek Kόtsari 
The Pontic Greeks and Armenians have many vigorous warlike dances such as the Kochari.

Unlike most Pontic dances, the Kotsari is in an even rhythm, originally danced in a closed circle. The dance is very popular today; however, it is often danced differently from the original. There is a consistent, vicious double bounce, also referred to as tremoulo. It is danced hand to shoulder and travels to the right. There are few variations which may be added to the step. It is a dance that tries to scare the viewers. At the start, it is danced by both men and women. Then, men go in front and do their figures.

See also

Gallery

References

External links
 Kochari music - Armenian sample; Assyrian sample;  Pontic sample;Turkish sample
 Kochari dance - UNESCO video

Armenian dances
Armenian music
Assyrian dances
Kurdish music
Azerbaijani dances
Circle dances
Pontic Greek dances
Folk dances